Woodcroft Castle is a moated medieval castle in the parish of Etton, Cambridgeshire, England.

History
Woodcroft Castle was built at the end of the 13th century near the city of Peterborough in the Soke of Peterborough (now in Cambridgeshire). The medieval portions of the castle today include the front range, the circular tower, and the gatehouse. There is debate as to whether the castle originally followed a normal Edwardian quadrilateral design, of which most has since been lost, or if it was simply never fully completed. Early Tudor additions (late 1400s) retained these medieval elements into the current design.

Woodcroft Castle was briefly held by the Royalists during the Second English Civil War and was successfully attacked and taken by Parliamentary forces in June 1648. Dr Michael Hudson, commander of the Royalist forces had attempted to raise forces for the King in Stamford, but was cornered by Parliamentarian forces under Colonel Thomas Waite and took refuge in the castle, which belonged to William FitzWilliam, 2nd Baron FitzWilliam, a Parliamentarian supporter. The siege lasted less than 48 hours, and ended with the death of Hudson, when he refused to surrender the building, and again refused to surrender when trapped at the top of the main tower.

The castle is a Grade II* listed building and the 18th-century barn and stable range is Grade II. Today, the castle is a private dwelling.

See also

Castles in Great Britain and Ireland
List of castles in England

References

Bibliography
Pettifer, Adrian. (2002) English Castles: a Guide by Counties. Woodbridge, UK: Boydell Press. .

Castles in Cambridgeshire
Grade II* listed buildings in Cambridgeshire
Grade II* listed castles
Buildings and structures in Peterborough